Castletown GAA is a Gaelic Athletic Association hurling club in County Laois, Ireland.

The club colours are blue and white.

The current Castletown club was founded in 1974 and has won a total of 8 Laois Senior Hurling Championship titles since 1995. They have also played in 3 Leinster Senior Club Hurling Championship finals but lost all 3. 

Famous Laois intercounty hurlers who have played for Castletown include Paul Cuddy, David Cuddy, Cyril Cuddy, John Lyons, Pat Mullaney, Barry McEvoy and James Hooban.

In terms of the club's history, it takes its roots from the Cuddagh team of the late 1950s and early 1960s when the club won Junior and Intermediate titles in successive years and lost out in the Laois SHC final the following year by the narrowest of margins to near neighbours, Camross, who themselves as a result were winning their first title.

Achievements
 Laois Senior Hurling Championship: 8
 1995, 1997, 1999, 2000, 2001, 2002, 2003, 2005.

Notable players

Gaelic games clubs in County Laois
Hurling clubs in County Laois
Gaelic football clubs in County Laois